K. africana may refer to:
 Kerivoula africana, the Tanzanian woolly bat, a bat species found only in Tanzania
 Kigelia africana, a flowering plant species found throughout tropical Africa

See also
 Africana (disambiguation)